The 2016–17 Texas A&M Aggies men's basketball team represented Texas A&M University in the 2016–17 NCAA Division I men's basketball season. The team's head coach was Billy Kennedy, who was in his sixth season at Texas A&M. The team played their home games at Reed Arena in College Station, Texas in its fifth season as a member of the Southeastern Conference. They finished the season 16–15, 8–10 in SEC play to finish in a tie for ninth place. They lost in the second round of the SEC tournament to Vanderbilt.

Previous season
The Texas A&M finished the season 28–9, 13–5 in SEC play to win a share of the SEC regular season championship. They defeated Florida and LSU to advance to the championship game of the SEC tournament where they lost to Kentucky. They received an at-large bid to the NCAA tournament where they defeated Green Bay and Northern Iowa to advance to the Sweet Sixteen where they lost to Oklahoma.

Departures

Incoming transfers

2016 recruiting class

Recruits for class of 2017

Roster

Schedule

|-
!colspan=12 style="background:#500000; color:#FFFFFF;"| Exhibition

|-
!colspan=12 style="background:#500000; color:#FFFFFF;"| Regular season

|-
!colspan=12 style="background:#500000; color:#FFFFFF;"|

References

Texas A&M Aggies men's basketball seasons
TexasAandM